Yoseph Imry (Hebrew: יוסף אמרי; born 23 February 1939 – 29 May 2018) was an Israeli physicist.

He was best known for taking part in the foundation of mesoscopic physics, a relatively new branch of condensed matter physics. It is concerned with how the behavior of systems whose size is in between micro- and macroscopic, crosses over between these two regimes. These systems can be handled and addressed by more or less usual macroscopic methods, but their behavior may still show quantum effects.

Awards and honours
In 1996, 2001 and 2016, Imry received the Rothschild Prize, Israel Prize and Wolf Prize in physics, respectively. Imry was the 1996 Lorentz Professor at Leiden University.

He was a member of the European Academy of Sciences and Arts (Salzburg), the European Academy of Sciences, Sciences and Humanities (Paris), the National Academy of Sciences, the American Physical Society and the Israel Academy of Sciences and Humanities.

See also
List of Israel Prize recipients

References

External links

home page

1939 births
2018 deaths
People from Tel Aviv
Israeli Jews
Israeli physicists
Israel Prize in physics recipients
Academic staff of Weizmann Institute of Science
Members of the Israel Academy of Sciences and Humanities
Members of the European Academy of Sciences and Arts
Foreign associates of the National Academy of Sciences
Hebrew University of Jerusalem alumni
Jewish physicists
Fellows of the American Physical Society
Wolf Prize in Physics laureates